Batu Kawa is a suburban area located right next to the 3rd Mile Roundabout in Kuching Division, State of Sarawak in Malaysia. The mukim is administratively under the Padawan Municipal Council. The Pan Borneo Highway passing through the area links Kuching City with Bau, Lundu and Sematan further west. This place is also known to have many hornet nest.

Etymology 
Batu Kawa can also be referred as Batu Kawah. The name of Batu Kawa is derived from the Malay words which “Batu” means stone and “Kawah” for wok used to cook rice. Source said that Batu Kawah is named with reference to a bunch of wok shape stone beside Batu Kawa River.

Governance
Batu Kawa forms one of the Sarawak state assembly district. During Sarawak state election, 2011, DAP candidate; Christina Chiew Wang See has won the seat against BN candidate; Tan Joo Phoi. (50.9% vrs 47.2%)

Geography

Batu Kawah New Township  
Batu Kawa New Township or affectionately called “MJC” by the Kuchingites is currently the biggest modern garden township development in Batu Kawah which provides the comfort and convenience to work, live, shop and play.

Batu Kawah New Township is a 265-acre integrated self-contained township planned with a whole array of modern facilities and amenities for your comforts. Existing public amenities such as Maybank and RHB Bank, bus and taxi stand, police station, post office, 24-hour security assistance center, town square, The Piazza, Park and Padang and public phone booths provide convenience, recreation and security assistance to all the residents within this township.

Apart from that, other facilities such as a new Wet & Dry Market and a Chinese Primary School, i.e. Chung Hua Sungai Tapang Hilir are now completed.

The design and planning of a new private hospital is being carried out by a reputable hospital group.

Other facilities such as secondary school, clubhouse, and commercial complex are proposed for future development.

Transportation
Batu Kawa area can be reached by two main roads named Jalan Batu Kawa-Tondong  (Section of Pan Borneo Highway)  and also Jalan Batu Kawa- Matang. Portion of Jalan Batu Kawa-Tondong separated by Sarawak River is linked with Jambatan Datuk Chong Kiun Kong.  (Datuk Chong Kiun Kong Bridge), it has been upgraded to dual carriage bridge under RM16 million budget to ease the traffic congestion along Jalan Batu Kawa-Tondong.

Other Utilities

Education
There are 12 small districts inside Batu Kawa area: Batu Kawa(石角)、Stapok(尖山)、Sin San Tu(新山肚)、Moyan(味源港)、Kim Choo Sing(金珠盛)、Luo Zhi Gan(罗知港)、Xia Sha Long（下沙垄）、Sungai Tapang (甲港)、Rantau Panjang(上湾头)、Sejijak (西里益)、Sungai Tengah(葫芦顶) 及Pangkalan Baru (新梯头). Due to population increase in each district, there’s a need to establish school for education purpose. 10 primary Chinese schools have been established among these 12 districts during earlier day and it remained to serve the peoples till present date. Besides that, one of the prestigious boarding schools, Sekolah Menengah Sains Kuching also located in Batu Kawa. There’s no public university  (tertiary education)  campus in Batu Kawa.

References

External links 
JPN Batu Kawah

Kuching District
Towns in Sarawak